FK Slovan Duslo Šaľa, the Slovak football club, also has a women's football team.

Its women's team won four national championships in a row between 2005 and 2008, consequently representing Slovakia in the European Cup. Most recently it was the runner-up in 2011, just one point behind Slovan Bratislava.

Honours
 Women
 Slovak League
 2005, 2006, 2007, 2008
 Slovak Cup
 2010

Record in UEFA competitions

References

External links
  Official women website
  FK Duslo Šaľa women's section website

Women's section
Women's football clubs in Slovakia
Association football clubs established in 1921
1921 establishments in Slovakia